The women's 4x100 metres relay event at the 2010 World Junior Championships in Athletics was held in Moncton, New Brunswick, Canada, at Moncton Stadium on 23 and 24 July.

Medalists

Results

Final
24 July

Heats
23 July

Heat 1

Heat 2

Participation
According to an unofficial count, 61 athletes from 14 countries participated in the event.

References

4 x 100 metres relay
Relays at the World Athletics U20 Championships
2010 in women's athletics